The XVIII Army Corps / XVIII AK was a corps level command of the German Army before and during World War I.

As the German Army expanded in the latter part of the 19th century, the XVIII Army Corps was set up on 1 April 1899 in Frankfurt am Main as the Generalkommando (headquarters) for the district of Wiesbaden and the Grand Duchy of Hesse. It took over command of 21st Division from XI Corps and the previously separate 25th (Grand Ducal Hessian) Division. It was assigned to the VII Army Inspectorate, but joined the 4th Army at the start of the First World War.

It was still in existence at the end of the war, serving in the 17th Army, Heeresgruppe Kronprinz Rupprecht on the Western Front.

Peacetime organisation 
The 25 peacetime Corps of the German Army (Guards, I – XXI, I – III Bavarian) had a reasonably standardised organisation. Each consisted of two divisions with usually two infantry brigades, one field artillery brigade and a cavalry brigade each. Each brigade normally consisted of two regiments of the appropriate type, so each Corps normally commanded 8 infantry, 4 field artillery and 4 cavalry regiments. There were exceptions to this rule:
V, VI, VII, IX and XIV Corps each had a 5th infantry brigade (so 10 infantry regiments)
II, XIII, XVIII and XXI Corps had a 9th infantry regiment
I, VI and XVI Corps had a 3rd cavalry brigade (so 6 cavalry regiments)
the Guards Corps had 11 infantry regiments (in 5 brigades) and 8 cavalry regiments (in 4 brigades).
Each Corps also directly controlled a number of other units. This could include one or more 
Foot Artillery Regiment
Jäger Battalion
Pioneer Battalion
Train Battalion

World War I

Organisation on mobilisation 
On mobilization, on 2 August 1914, the Corps was restructured. The 25th Cavalry Brigade was withdrawn to form part of the 3rd Cavalry Division and the 21st Cavalry Brigade was broken up and its regiments assigned to the divisions as reconnaissance units. The 168th Infantry Regiment was assigned to the 25th Reserve Division in XVIII Reserve Corps. Divisions received engineer companies and other support units from the Corps headquarters. In summary, XVIII Corps mobilised with 24 infantry battalions, 8 machine gun companies (48 machine guns), 8 cavalry squadrons, 24 field artillery batteries (144 guns), 4 heavy artillery batteries (16 guns), 3 pioneer companies and an aviation detachment.

Combat chronicle 
On mobilisation, XVIII Corps was assigned to the 4th Army forming part of the centre of the forces for the Schlieffen Plan offensive in August 1914. It was still in existence at the end of the war, serving in the 17th Army, Heeresgruppe Kronprinz Rupprecht on the Western Front.

Commanders 
The XVIII Corps had the following commanders during its existence:

See also 

German Army order of battle (1914)
German Army order of battle, Western Front (1918)
List of Imperial German infantry regiments
List of Imperial German artillery regiments
List of Imperial German cavalry regiments

References 

 XVIII. Armeekorps (Chronik 1914/1918)
 Claus von Bredow, bearb., Historische Rang- und Stammliste des deuschen Heeres (1905)
 Günter Wegner, Stellenbesetzung der deutschen Heere 1815–1939. (Biblio Verlag, Osnabrück, 1993), Bd. 1

Bibliography 
 
 
 
 
 

Corps of Germany in World War I
Military units and formations established in 1899
Military units and formations disestablished in 1919